The 1981 AIAW National Division II Basketball Championship was the second annual tournament hosted by the Association for Intercollegiate Athletics for Women to determine the national champion of collegiate basketball among its Division II members in the United States.

The tournament was held at the University of Dayton in Dayton, Ohio.

William Penn defeated College of Charleston in the championship game, 64–51, to capture the Statesmen's first AIAW Division II national title.

Format
Sixteen teams participated in a single-elimination tournament, a decrease in eight teams from the previous year's championship.

The tournament also included a third-place game for the two teams that lost in the semifinal games.

Tournament bracket

See also
1981 AIAW National Division I Basketball Championship
1981 AIAW National Division III Basketball Championship
1981 NAIA women's basketball tournament

References

AIAW women's basketball tournament
AIAW Division II
AIAW National Division II Basketball Championship
1981 in sports in Ohio
Women's sports in Ohio